Dune is the self-titled first album by German band Dune. It was released in 1995 on the label Motor Music. The album peaked at number 21 in Germany, 59 in the Netherlands, and 20 in Switzerland.

Track listing
All tracks by Bernd Burhoff, Oliver Froning and Jens Oetrich except where noted.

 "In The Beginning..." – 0:48
 "Hardcore Vibes" – 3:33
 "Just Another Dream" – 4:08
 "Future is Now" – 4:57
 "Final Dream" – 4:25
 "The Spice" – 4:34
 "Are You Ready to Fly" (Tim Cox, Nigel Swanston) – 3:32
 "Can't Stop Raving" – 4:32
 "Up!" – 4:29
 "Generation Love" – 4:56
 "Positiv Energy" – 4:17
 "Make Sense" – 5:10
 "...In The End" – 8:05

The track "...In the End" is credited with a length of 8:05, but its actual runtime is 10:58. A distorted recording of Tchaikovsky Piano Concerto No. 1, 2nd Movement can be heard in the last 55 seconds, long after the actual track has faded out into silence.

References

1995 debut albums
Dune (band) albums